Jeffrey Stone (December 16, 1926 – August 22, 2012) was an American actor and voice-over artist. Stone was the model and inspiration for Prince Charming in the 1950 Walt Disney animated feature film, Cinderella. While he did not voice the character in the film, Stone did provide some of the film's additional voices.

Personal life

Stone was born John Forrest Fontaine on December 16, 1926, in Detroit, Michigan. He was raised in an Indiana orphanage throughout most of his early life after the death of his father. He enlisted in the United States Navy during World War II. His first marriage, in 1947, to actress Barbara Lawrence ended in divorce the following year. Stone was then married to his second wife, Corinne Calvet, a French actress, from 1955 to 1960, with whom he had one child. In 1965, he married Christina Lee, but they divorced in 1972.

Acting career
After minor uncredited appearances in a pair of 1948 movies, Stone earned his first credit, under the stage name John Fontaine, with a voice role in Cinderella in 1950. His next film, and first credited on screen role, was the 1952 film Army Bound, again as John Fontaine. He then appeared in three films released in 1953—Fighter Attack, Bad for Each Other, starring Charlton Heston, and Wonder Valley—as well as the 1954 film noir, Drive a Crooked Road. During the later 1950s, Stone co-starred in Edge of Hell in 1956 and Zsa Zsa Gabor's The Girl in the Kremlin in 1957. He then appeared in four films released in 1958: The Big Beat, Damn Citizen, The Thing That Couldn't Die and Money, Women and Guns.

Stone's roles during the 1950s extended to television as well. In 1954, he starred in the Italian television series, I Tre moschettieri (The Three Musketeers) as D'Artagnan opposite Paul Campbell (as Aramis), Sebastian Cabot (as Porthos), and Domenico Modugno (as Athos). Individual episodes of the series were merged for release as feature films in European theaters including Knights of the Queen in 1954; The King's Musketeers and La Spada Imbattibile, both released in Europe in 1957; Le Imprese di Una Spada Leggendaria in 1958; and Mantelli Espade Insanguinate in 1959. Stone's other television credits included roles in Adventures in Paradise, The Outer Limits, The Californians, Johnny Midnight, and Surfside 6.

In 1960, he appeared in the comedic film, When the Girls Take Over. Stone also starred as Zorro in the 1960 Mexican Spanish film, El Jinete Solitario en El Valle de los Desaparecidos: La Venganza del Jinete Solitario. He wrote the story for the 1964 low-budget British sci-fi film, Unearthly Stranger. Stone wrote and directed Strange Portrait, a feature film that never saw a release.

Post-career
Stone moved to Penang, Malaysia, during the early 1960s. He soon left the entertainment industry to travel in Southeast Asia. He wrote several novels during his later life, including The Other Side of Rainbow and Letters to Rainbow.

In 2010, he published his autobiography, Whatever Happened To Prince Charming?. Stone died at his home in Penang on August 22, 2012 at age 85.

Filmography

References

External links

1926 births
2012 deaths
American male film actors
American male voice actors
American male television actors
American male screenwriters
21st-century American novelists
American male novelists
American autobiographers
American expatriates in Malaysia
People from Penang
United States Navy personnel of World War II
Male actors from Indiana
Film directors from Indiana
20th-century American male actors
20th-century American novelists
20th-century American male writers
21st-century American male writers
20th-century American non-fiction writers
21st-century American non-fiction writers
American male non-fiction writers